Lincolnton Recreation Department Youth Center was a historic clubhouse building located at Lincolnton, Lincoln County, North Carolina.  It was built as a temporary school about 1921 and renovated and enlarged in 1947.  It was a single-story wood-frame building with a truncated hipped roof in the Bungalow / American Craftsman style.   It sat on an exposed basement at the rear, with brick, asphalt, and wood as its basic materials. The Center continued to function until 1989, but was demolished in August, 2019.

It was listed on the National Register of Historic Places in 2009.

References

Clubhouses on the National Register of Historic Places in North Carolina
Government buildings completed in 1947
Buildings and structures in Lincoln County, North Carolina
National Register of Historic Places in Lincoln County, North Carolina